The Man in Black 1963–1969 is the 82nd album by Johnny Cash. It was released in March 1994 by Bear Family Records and is the fourth box set, containing 6 CDs of Cash's music. The album peaked at number 37 in Australia.

Track listing

Credits
Mastered by Dave Young
Producers Don Law, Frank Jones, Jack Clement 
Reissue Producers Colin Escott, Richard Weize

References

External links
Bear Family Records
Discogs entry

1995 compilation albums
Johnny Cash compilation albums
Bear Family Records compilation albums